June Gibbons (born 11 April 1963) and Jennifer Gibbons (11 April 1963 – 9 March 1993) were identical twins who grew up in Wales. They became known as "The Silent Twins", since they only communicated with each other. They wrote works of fiction. Both women were admitted to Broadmoor Hospital, where they were held for eleven years.

Early life 
June and Jennifer were the daughters of Caribbean immigrants Gloria and Aubrey Gibbons. The Gibbons family moved from Barbados to the United Kingdom in the early 1960s, as part of the Windrush generation. Gloria was a housewife and Aubrey worked as a technician for the Royal Air Force. The couple also had three other children: Greta was born in 1957, David was born in 1959, and Rosie was born in 1967.

In 1960 Aubrey went to stay with a relative in Coventry and soon qualified as a staff technician. Gloria followed, with Greta and David, several months later. The twins were born on 11 April, 1963, at a military hospital in Aden, Yemen, where their father had been deployed. The family soon relocated—first to England, and in 1974, to Haverfordwest, Wales. The twin sisters were inseparable and their language, a sped-up Bajan Creole, made it difficult for people to understand them.

The Gibbons children were the only black children in the community, and were often ostracized at school. This proved to be traumatic for the twins, eventually causing their school administrators to dismiss them early each day so that they might avoid bullying. Their language became even more idiosyncratic at this time. Soon it was unintelligible to others. Their language, or idioglossia, qualified as an example of cryptophasia, exemplified by the twins' simultaneous actions, which often mirrored each other. The twins became increasingly reserved and eventually spoke to no one except each other and their younger sister Rose.

The girls continued to attend school, although they refused to read or write. In 1974, a medic administering vaccinations at the school noted their impassive behaviour and notified a child psychologist. The twins began seeing a succession of therapists who tried unsuccessfully to get them to communicate with others. They were sent to separate boarding schools in an attempt to break their isolation, but the pair became catatonic and entirely withdrawn when parted.

Creative expression
When they were reunited, the two spent several years isolating themselves in their bedroom, engaged in elaborate plays with dolls. They created many plays and stories in a sort of soap opera style, reading some of them aloud on tape as gifts for their sister Rose. Inspired by a pair of gift diaries on Christmas 1979, they began their writing careers. They sent away for a mail order course in creative writing, and each kept an extensive diary and wrote a number of stories, poems and novels. Set primarily in the United States and particularly in Malibu, California, the stories involve young men and women who exhibit strange and often criminal behaviour.

June wrote a novel titled The Pepsi-Cola Addict, in which the high-school hero is seduced by a teacher, then sent away to a reformatory where a homosexual guard makes a play for him. The two girls pooled together their unemployment benefits in order to get the novel published by a vanity press. This is the only accessible work by either of the Gibbons sisters, which remained unavailable for purchase and held in only five libraries in the world until October 2022, when it was republished as a limited edition print by Cashen's Gap. It will also be published as a paperback in May 2023 by MIT Press. Their other attempts to publish novels and stories were unsuccessful, although Cashen's Gap is planning future releases by June and Jennifer Gibbons. In Jennifer's The Pugilist, a physician is so eager to save his child's life that he kills the family dog to obtain its heart for a transplant. The dog's spirit lives on in the child and ultimately has its revenge against the father. Jennifer also wrote Discomania, the story of a young woman who discovers that the atmosphere of a local disco incites patrons to insane violence. She followed up with The Taxi-Driver's Son, a radio play called Postman and Postwoman, and several short stories. June Gibbons is considered to be an outsider writer.

Hospitalization
In their later teenage years, the twins began using drugs and alcohol. In 1981, the girls committed a number of crimes including vandalism, petty theft and arson, which led to their being admitted to Broadmoor Hospital, a high-security mental health hospital. The twins were sentenced to indefinite detention under the Mental Health Act 1983. They remained at Broadmoor for eleven years. June later blamed this lengthy sentence on their selective muteness: "Juvenile delinquents get two years in prison... We got twelve years of hell because we didn't speak... We lost hope, really. I wrote a letter to the Queen, asking her to get us out. But we were trapped." Placed on high doses of antipsychotic medications, they found themselves unable to concentrate; Jennifer apparently developed tardive dyskinesia (a neurological disorder resulting in involuntary, repetitive movements). Their medications were apparently adjusted sufficiently to allow them to continue the copious diaries they had begun in 1980, and they were able to join the hospital choir, but they lost most of their interest in creative writing.

The case achieved notoriety due to newspaper coverage by journalist Marjorie Wallace of The Sunday Times. Wallace later wrote a book about the two titled The Silent Twins, published in 1986 by Prentice Hall.

Jennifer's death
According to Wallace, the girls had a longstanding agreement that if one died, the other must begin to speak and live a normal life. During their stay in the hospital, they began to believe that it was necessary for one of them to die, and after much discussion, Jennifer agreed to make the sacrifice of her life. In March 1993, the twins were transferred from Broadmoor to the more open Caswell Clinic in Bridgend, Wales. On arrival Jennifer could not be roused. She was taken to the hospital where she died soon after of acute myocarditis, a sudden inflammation of the heart. There was no evidence of drugs or poison in her system.

At the inquest, June revealed that Jennifer had been acting strangely for about a day before their release; her speech had been slurring, and she had said that she was dying. On the trip to Caswell, she had slept in June's lap with her eyes open. On a visit a few days later, Wallace recounted that June "was in a strange mood." She said, "I'm free at last, liberated, and at last Jennifer has given up her life for me". She also described it as a tsunami, washing her of her sins and being free of her sister. Jennifer was interred in St Martin's Cemetery, Haverfordwest, Pembrokeshire, Wales.

After Jennifer's death, June gave interviews with Harper's Bazaar and The Guardian. By 2008, she was living quietly and independently, near her parents in West Wales. She was no longer monitored by psychiatric services, has been accepted by her community, and sought to put the past behind her. A 2016 interview with her sister Greta revealed that the family had been deeply troubled by the girls' incarceration. She blamed Broadmoor for ruining their lives and for neglecting Jennifer's health. She had wanted to file a lawsuit against Broadmoor, but Aubrey and Gloria refused, saying it would not bring Jennifer back.

In the media 

The pair were the subject of the 1986 television drama The Silent Twins, broadcast on BBC2 as part of its Screen Two series, and an Inside Story documentary Silent Twin – Without My Shadow, which aired on BBC1 in September 1994. A play based on Wallace's book, titled Speechless, debuted in London in 2011.

The twins' story also inspired the 1998 Manic Street Preachers song "Tsunami".

Polish filmmaker Agnieszka Smoczyńska directed a feature film with the twins as the subject, starring Letitia Wright and Tamara Lawrance, based on the 1986 book The Silent Twins by Marjorie Wallace. Her English-language debut, the film was an international co-production between the United Kingdom's 42 Management & Production and Poland's Mandats and backed by the Polish Film Institute and Moderator Inwestycje.

Angeline Morrison's 2022 album The Sorrow Songs (Folk Songs of Black British Experience) features a song about the twins, "The Flames They Do Grow High".

The American poet, Lucie Brock-Broido, wrote a poem — entitled "Elective Mutes" — about the twins in her first book,The Hunger, Alfred A. Knopf, 1988.

See also
Ursula and Sabina Eriksson
Poto and Cabengo

References

Citations

General and cited sources
 Oliver Sacks, "Bound Together in Fantasy and Crime" in The New York Times review of The Silent Twins, 19 October 1986.
 "Jennifer Gibbons, 29, 'Silent Twin' of a Study"—Announcement of Jennifer's death in The New York Times, 12 March 1993.

1963 births
1993 deaths
20th-century Barbadian writers
20th-century Welsh novelists
Barbadian emigrants to Wales
Black British women writers
British identical twins
Identical twin females
Living people
People acquitted by reason of insanity
People detained at Broadmoor Hospital
People from Haverfordwest
Welsh twins